Peter Preece is a former rugby union international who represented England from 1972 to 1976.  Educated at King Henry viii School, Coventry

Early life
Peter Preece was born on 15 November 1949 in Meriden. His father, Ivor Preece, was also a rugby union international who captained England and represented the British Lions in the 1950s.

Rugby union career
Preece made his international debut on 3 June 1972  at Ellis Park in the South Africa vs England match.
Of the 12 matches he played for his national side he was on the winning side on 4 occasions.
He played his final match for England on 17 January 1976 at Twickenham in the England vs Wales match.

References

1949 births
Living people
English rugby union players
England international rugby union players
Rugby union centres
Rugby union players from Solihull
England international rugby sevens players